Komarada is a village in West Godavari district in the state of Andhra Pradesh in India.

Demographics
 India census, Komarada has a population of 2289 of which 1172 are males while 1117 are females. The average sex ratio of Komarada village is 953. The child population is 216, which makes up 9.44% of the total population of the village, with sex ratio 982. In 2011, the literacy rate of Komarada village was 76.22% when compared to 67.02% of Andhra Pradesh.

See also 
 Eluru

References 

Villages in West Godavari district